Wolfenden is a surname of Old English origin meaning 'the valley of Wulfhelm' and derives from the location or township of Wolfenden near Newchurch-in-Rossendale, Lancashire. Other variants include Woolfenden.

Surname 

 Chantel Louise Wolfenden (born 1986), Austrialian paralympic swimmer
 Christopher Wolfenden (born 1977), Canadian volleyball player
 Hugh Herbert Wolfenden (1892–1968), Canadian actuary and statistician
 Jacquie Sonia Durrell (née Wolfenden) (born 1929), British naturalist
 James Paine Wolfenden (1889–1949), United States congressman
 Jeremy Wolfenden (1934–1965), British journalist and spy
 Matthew Wolfenden (born 1987), British footballer
 Matthew Wolfenden (born 1980), British actor
 Richard Vance Wolfenden (born 1935), American biochemist
 Richard Norris Wolfenden (1854–1926), English physician and oceanographer
 Guy Anthony Woolfenden (1937–2016), English composer and conductor

See also 
 John Wolfenden, Baron Wolfenden (1906–1985), British educator and author of the Wolfenden Report (1957)
 Wolfenden (disambiguation)

References

English-language surnames
English toponymic surnames
Surnames of English origin